Estradiol undecylate/norethisterone enanthate (EU/NETE) is a combination medication of estradiol undecylate (EU), an estrogen, and norethisterone enanthate (NETE), a progestin, which was developed by Schering for potential use as a combined injectable contraceptive in women but was ultimately never marketed. It contained 5 to 10 mg EU and 50 to 70 mg NETE in oil solution and was intended for use by intramuscular injection at regular intervals. Although never commercialized, EU/NETE was found to be effective and well tolerated.

See also
 Polyestradiol phosphate/medroxyprogesterone acetate
 List of combined sex-hormonal preparations § Estrogens and progestogens

References

Abandoned drugs
Combined estrogen–progestogen formulations
Combined injectable contraceptives